David Shimer is an American historian and foreign policy analyst. He is a Global Fellow at the Wilson Center and an Associate Fellow at Yale University.

Shimer graduated from Yale University with bachelor's and master's degrees in history and was a Marshall Scholar and a Truman Scholar at the University of Oxford, where he is pursuing his doctorate in international relations.

Works 
In June 2020, Shimer published the book Rigged: America, Russia, and One Hundred Years of Covert Electoral Interference (Knopf), a global history of foreign election interference.

The New York Times, in its review of Rigged, said the book was “extraordinary and gripping” and had “the insight of a superb work of history.” Rigged was also positively reviewed by NPR, The Washington Post, and The Guardian.

References

Living people
American historians
Yale University alumni
Marshall Scholars
Year of birth missing (living people)